Minnewasta Lake is a natural lake in Day County, South Dakota, in the United States. Minnewasta is a name derived from an Eastern Dakota language word mniwašte meaning "good water".

See also
List of lakes in South Dakota

References

Lakes of South Dakota
Lakes of Day County, South Dakota